Caroline Garcia defeated Aryna Sabalenka in the final, 7–6(7–4), 6–4 to win the women's singles tennis title at the 2022 WTA Finals. Garcia became the first Frenchwoman to win the season-ending championships since Amélie Mauresmo in 2005. 

Sabalenka became the fourth player in the Open Era after Steffi Graf and Williams sisters to defeat, for the first time since 2008, the top-three ranked players at the same event; defeating world No. 2 Ons Jabeur and No. 3 Jessica Pegula in the respective round robin matches and No. 1 Iga Świątek in the semifinals. Sabalenka remains to day the only player, who did not win a tournament after this achievement.

Garbiñe Muguruza was the reigning champion, but did not qualify this year.

Jabeur, Pegula, Coco Gauff and Daria Kasatkina all made their singles debut at the event, although this marked the first time since 2012 that none of the debutants advanced past the round-robin stage.

This marked the first time since 2015 where two players won all three of their round-robin matches but were both defeated in the semifinals.

Seeds

Alternates

Draw

Finals

Group Tracy Austin

Group Nancy Richey

References

External links
 Main draw
 Official website
 WTA website draw

2022 Singles
Finals